Revolutionära Socialistiska Partiet, a Swedish political party founded in 1945, as the Independent Labour Party. It was founded by a group that had split from the Left Socialist Party (VSP), when VSP had developed in a pro-Western direction. Leaders included Evald Höglund and Gottfrid Nyberg.

OAP published two issues of Vårt Ord.

In 1949 the group was reconstructed as Revolutionary Socialists (Revolutionära Socialister). RS became the first Swedish section of the Fourth International. The following year it changed name to RSP at a conference in Stockholm. The group gathered around a dozen persons. 

RSP was active in the 1950 municipal elections in Stockholm (they got 1900 votes) and during the dockers' strike of 1951. RSP published two issues of Internationalen.

RSP was a short-lived party. Soon the leadership of FI ordered RSP to enter SAP and practice fraction politics, entryism, within this party. The members of RSP opposed this, and the organization was dissolved in 1953.

See also
 Left Socialist Party (Sweden), Vänstersocialistiska partiet, 1940–1963)
 National Socialist People's Party of Sweden
 National Socialist Workers' Party (Sweden)
 Socialist Party (Sweden, 1929), Socialistiska partiet, 1929–1944
 Socialist Party (Sweden, 1971)
 Socialist Workers' Party of Sweden

References

External links
 Articles on RSP at trotskij.se

Political parties established in 1945
Defunct communist parties in Sweden
Trotskyist organizations in Sweden
1945 establishments in Sweden
Political parties disestablished in 1953
1953 disestablishments in Sweden